Nepean was an electoral district of the Legislative Assembly in the Australian state of New South Wales, originally created in 1859, and named after the Nepean River. It was abolished in 1904 due to the re-distribution of electorates following the 1903 New South Wales referendum, which required the number of members of the Legislative Assembly to be reduced from 125 to 90. Nepean was recreated in 1927 and abolished again in 1981.

Members for Nepean

Election results

References

Former electoral districts of New South Wales
Constituencies established in 1859
1859 establishments in Australia
Constituencies disestablished in 1904
1904 disestablishments in Australia
Constituencies established in 1927
1927 establishments in Australia
Constituencies disestablished in 1981
1981 disestablishments in Australia